Ceroprepes lunata is a species of snout moth in the genus Ceroprepes. It was described by Y. Du, S. Song and D. Yang in 2005 and is found in China.

References

Moths described in 2005
Phycitinae